Eugene Francois Butterworth (born 19 September 1984) is a South African rugby union footballer, currently playing with Western Province Premier League club side Durbanville-Bellville. His regular playing position is tighthead prop.

External links 

itsrugby.co.uk profile

1984 births
Living people
Boland Cavaliers players
Griquas (rugby union) players
Rugby union players from Bellville, South Africa
Rugby union props
South African rugby union players